Bottchers Gap (sometimes spelled Botcher's Gap) (closed ) is a day use area, campground, and trail head. It is located between Mescal Ridge and Skinner Ridge. Beginning at Bottchers Gap, it is a difficult  hike via the Skinner Ridge and Ventana Double Cone trails to the Ventana Double Cone, making it one of the more distant locations in the wilderness.

History

Native Americans 

The area was first occupied by the Esselen indigenous people, who harvested acorns on the nearby mountain slopes. The area terrain is mostly steep, rocky, semi-arid except for the narrow canyons, and inaccessible, making long-term habitation a challenge. The holes were hollowed out over many generations by Indians who used it to grind the acorns into flour. Much of the native Indian population had been forced into the Spanish mission system by about 1822, when most of the interior villages within the current Los Padres National Forest were uninhabited.

Homestead 

The camp is named for former homesteader John Gottfried Boettcher, a German immigrant who lived in a cabin on the site with his wife Pauline around 1885–90. Skinner Ridge and Skinner Creek are named for Benjamin R. Skinner, who homesteaded the land with his wife Adeline and obtained a patent in 1890 to 160 acres northwest of Bottcher's land. Turner Creek, north of Skinner's homestead, was homesteaded by George C. Turner in 1890. After filing a patent for a homestead, the settler had complete ownership after residing on the property for five years or after six months with payment of $1.50 per acre.

Guard Station 

On July 23, 1948, the Monterey Bay Area Council of the Boy Scouts of America purchased   on the North Fork of the Little Sur River from the Hearst Sunical Land and Packing Company for $20,000. The Palo Colorado Road ended at that time at a location locally known as the Hoist. The name came about because of the very steep road which during the turn of the century required wagon-loads of tanbark and lumber to be hoisted by block and tackle hitched to oxen. The old block and tackle is still chained to a massive log beam, now used to support mailboxes and labeled "The Hoist." The council contacted nearby Fort Ord and contracted with the United States Army Corps of Engineers to extend the road  to Bottchers Gap and an additional  to the North Fork of the Little Sur River and future site of Camp Pico Blanco. The Monterey Boy Scout Council spent about $200,000 (or about  $ today) to extend the road to Bottchers Gap and into the camp area. The road to the Boy Scout camp traverses extremely steep terrain, necessitating four narrow switchbacks. The entire road into the central camp area was completed in the summer of 1951.

The USFS Bottchers Gap Guard Station was built in 1950 along with the Double Cone Trail. The Bottchers Gap Forest Patrolman took supplies twice monthly by pack mules to the forest fire lookout on the Ventana Double Cone during the summer fire lookout season. The patrolman and the mule train usually spent one night of the trip at the old Comings Cabin.

Geology 

Bottcher's Gap sits in a notch between Mescal Ridge and Skinner Ridge formed by the Palo Colorado fault where it crosses the ridge. The east side of the fault in the gap is primarily an upthrown block of quartz diorite, while the west side of the fault is composed mostly of metamorphic rocks including schist and gneiss. The fault-formed north fork of Little Sur River is located to the southeast, and the river flows along the fault for about  before turning west towards the coast.

Facilities 

The campground is at  elevation in a saddle between two ridges among oaks and Madrone trees.  There are 12 campsites with fire rings. The camp is managed by Camp One parks management company. A campground manager is usually hired to live on site. No reservations are required. Camp One charges a $20.00 per night per single family site for up to 6 people and 1 vehicle, $10.00 per extra person per night, and $10.00 extra vehicle charge (up to 2) per night. The day use fee is $10.00 per vehicle. Camp One more than doubled fees when they won the contract to manage the campground. In 2013, the camping fee was $5 for parking and day use.

There used to be a water system fed by a tank uphill of the campground. The system was not maintained and is no longer usable. Visitors must bring their own water. There are good views of the Ventana Double Cone and Pico Blanco in the Santa Lucia Range to the south. The Skinner Ridge Trailhead (#1E04) is on the north side of the campground. The trail crosses over Devil's Peak and through Big Pines, Pat Springs, Little Pines, and Lone Pine camps.

Closure 

The campground was closed when the Soberanes Fire was started by campers who left a fire untended on July 22, 2016. The fire burned through Palo Colorado Canyon in less than two days, destroying 57 homes and 11 outbuildings in the Garrapata and Palo Colorado Canyon areas. The following winter Rocky Creek washed out the road, and additional slides and slip outs closed the road. Monterey County states that it does not have the funds to repair the road.

Notes

References

Further reading 

This article contains text in the public domain from U.S. Government publications and web sites.

Parks in Monterey County, California
Monterey Ranger District, Los Padres National Forest
Hiking trails in California
Big Sur